Jean Mitchell may refer to:
 Jean Mitchell (geographer)
 Jean Mitchell (sailor)
 Jean Mitchell (netball)
 Jean Mitchell (rower)

See also
 Jean Holmes-Mitchell, Panamanian sprinter